Vincenzo Fontana (fl. 1550) was an Italian composer. He was mainly known for his canzoni villanesche.

References

16th-century Italian composers
Renaissance composers
Italian male classical composers